Death and Life (German: Tod und Leben, Italian: Morte e Vita) is an oil on canvas painting by Austrian painter Gustav Klimt. The painting was started in 1908 and completed in 1915. It is created in an Art Nouveau (Modern) style by use of allegorical painting genre during Golden phase. The painting measures 178 by 198 centimeters and is now housed at the Leopold Museum in Vienna.

History 

In 1911 Death and Life received first prize in the world exhibitions in Rome. In 1912 Klimt exhibited the painting at an art exhibition in Dresden.

Further exhibitions of the painting took place e.g. 1913 in Budapest and Mannheim, 1914 in Prague, 1916 in Berlin, 1917 in Stockholm, 1917 / 1918 in Copenhagen, 1918 in Zurich and from 1923 several times in Vienna, 1958 in Venice and 1965 in New York and London.

Klimt made changes to the painting in 1915, after the first five exhibitions of the painting. He changed the background from gold-colored to grey and added some mosaics.

Description 
This is one of Klimt's central themes, central also to his time and to his contemporaries among them Edvard Munch and Egon Schiele. Klimt makes of it a modern dance of death, but unlike Schiele, he introduces a note of hope and reconciliation, instead of feeling threatened by the figure of death, his human beings seem to disregard it. The imagination of the artist is focused no longer on physical union, but rather on the expectation that precedes it. Perhaps this new found serenity is rooted in Klimt's own awareness of aging and closeness to death. But before the moment came when he chose to depict nothing more than moments of intense pleasure or miraculous beauty and youth.

Climate protest 

On 15 November 2022 members of climate protest group Letzte Generation Österreich (Last Generation Austria) threw a black oily liquid onto the painting's protective glass, protesting "oil and gas drilling ... a death sentence to society"; one glued themself to the glass. The painting underneath remained undamaged.

References

External links 
 Analysis of Gustav Klimt's Death and Life

1915 paintings
Paintings by Gustav Klimt
20th-century allegorical paintings
Allegorical paintings by Austrian artists
Paintings in the collection of the Leopold Museum
Paintings about death
Paintings of children
Paintings of people
Oil on canvas paintings
Skulls in art